Abdullahi Bile Noor, better known as
Bile, is a Somali politician. He served for many years in the government and has extensive experience in public policy, public administration and business. He currently serves as Member of the Federal Parliament of Somalia and a member of the current cabinet. He is one of Somalia's longest serving national legislators.

Career
Bile served for the government for many years and was a cabinet member for various Somali governments. He is one of the country's most popular politicians due to his long-time national service.

On August 13, 2000, Bile was selected as a member of the newly installed transitional parliament of Somalia; he still holds this post.

On 17 January 2015, Bile was appointed the new State Minister of Post, Telecommunication and Technology of Somalia by Prime Minister Hassan Ali Khaire.

He previously served as Assistant Minister of Information, Postal Cooperation and Telecommunication of Somalia later formed part of government served as State Minister of Justice. Bile was later switched into Ministry of Education, Cultural & Higher Education of Somalia where he served as State Minister.

Early life
Bile is originally from northeastern Puntland. He hails Dishiishe clan and was born in the coastal town of Bosaso in the northeastern Bari region of Somalia.

He graduated with honor from Somali National University.

References

Living people
Government ministers of Somalia
Somali National University alumni
1965 births